Norman Frederick Jewison  (born July 21, 1926) is a retired Canadian film and television director, producer, and founder of the Canadian Film Centre.

He has directed numerous feature films and has been nominated for the Academy Award for Best Director three times in three separate decades for In the Heat of the Night (1967), Fiddler on the Roof (1971) and Moonstruck (1987). Other highlights of his directing career include The Cincinnati Kid (1965), The Russians Are Coming, the Russians Are Coming (1966), The Thomas Crown Affair (1968), Jesus Christ Superstar (1973), Rollerball (1975), F.I.S.T. (1978), ...And Justice for All (1979), A Soldier's Story (1984), Agnes of God (1985), Other People's Money (1991), The Hurricane (1999), and The Statement (2003).

Jewison has addressed social and political issues throughout his filmmaking career, often making controversial or complicated subjects accessible to mainstream audiences. He has won accolades around the world, including numerous Golden Globe nominations, a BAFTA Award, the Silver Bear for Best Director at the Berlin Film Festival, Lifetime Achievement Awards from both the Directors Guild of Canada and America, and the Irving G. Thalberg Memorial Award at the 71st annual Academy Awards.

In 2003, Jewison received the Governor General's Performing Arts Award for Lifetime Artistic Achievement for his multiple contributions to the film industry in Canada.

Early life
Jewison was born in Toronto, Ontario, the son of Dorothy Irene (née Weaver) and Percy Joseph Jewison (1890–1974), who managed a convenience store and post office. He attended Kew Beach School and Malvern Collegiate Institute, and while growing up in the 1930s displayed an aptitude for performing and theatre. He is often mistaken for being Jewish due to his surname and direction of Fiddler on the Roof, but Jewison and his family are Protestants of English descent. He served in the Royal Canadian Navy (1944–1945) during World War II, and after being discharged travelled in the American South, where he encountered segregation, an experience that influenced his later work.

Jewison attended Victoria College in the University of Toronto, graduating with a B.A. in 1949. As a student, he was involved in writing, directing and acting in various theatrical productions, including the All-Varsity Revue in 1949. Following graduation, he moved to London, where he worked sporadically as a script writer for a children's TV program and bit part actor for the BBC, while supporting himself with odd jobs. Out of work in Britain in late 1951, he returned to Canada to become a production trainee at CBLT in Toronto, which was preparing for the launch of CBC Television.

Career

Television
When CBC Television went on the air in the fall of 1952, Jewison was an assistant director. During the next seven years he wrote, directed, and produced a wide variety of musicals, comedy-variety shows, dramas, and specials, including The Big Revue, Showtime and The Barris Beat. In 1953 he married Margaret Ann "Dixie" Dixon, a former model. They had three children – Michael, Kevin, and Jennifer – who all pursued careers in the entertainment industry.

In 1958 Jewison was recruited to work for NBC in New York, where his first assignment was Your Hit Parade, followed by The Andy Williams Show. The success of these shows led to directing specials featuring performers such as Harry Belafonte, Jackie Gleason, and Danny Kaye. The television production that proved pivotal to Jewison's career was the Judy Garland "comeback" special that aired in 1961, which included Frank Sinatra and Dean Martin, and led to a weekly show that Jewison was later called in to direct. Visiting the studio during rehearsal for the special, actor Tony Curtis suggested to Jewison that he should direct a feature film. It was not until the early 1990s that he branched back into television, starting with producing the TNT biographical film Geronimo (1993).

Film

Jewison's career as a film director began when Tony Curtis' film production company, Curtleigh Productions, hired him to direct the comedy 40 Pounds of Trouble in February 1962. The film was financed and distributed by Universal-International Pictures and was the first motion picture ever filmed at Disneyland. Curtleigh Productions' contract with Jewison had a negotiable option for further films if the initial picture was successful. In early October 1962, Jewison formed his own independent film production company, SImkoe Productions, and signed a two-picture deal with Curtis' new film production company, Curtis Enterprises, as well as an additional two-picture deal with Universal-International Pictures.

Although the two pictures for Curtis Enterprises were not made, both films for Universal-International Pictures were. He made two comedies starring Doris Day: The Thrill of It All, released in 1963 and co-starring James Garner, and Send Me No Flowers, released in 1964 and co-starring Rock Hudson. After another comedy, The Art of Love (1965), Jewison was determined to escape from the genre and tackle more demanding projects.

His breakthrough film proved to be The Cincinnati Kid (1965), a drama starring Steve McQueen, now considered one of the finest movies made about gambling, and Jewison considers it one of his personal favourites because it was his first challenging drama. This success was followed in 1966 by a satire on Cold War paranoia, The Russians Are Coming, the Russians Are Coming; it was the first film Jewison also produced, and it was nominated for four Academy Awards, including Best Picture. He felt that doing "a plea for coexistence, or the absurdity of international conflict was important right at that moment". While reaction to Russians was positive, Jewison was labeled as "a Canadian pinko" by right-wing commentators.

Continuing the string of successes was one of the films that has become closely identified with its director, In the Heat of the Night (1967), a crime drama set in a racially divided Southern town and starring Sidney Poitier and Rod Steiger, which won five Academy Awards, including Best Picture, while Jewison was nominated for Best Director. While he was filming, Robert Kennedy told Jewison that this could be "a very important film. Timing is everything". Kennedy reminded Jewison of that prediction a year and a half later when he presented him with the Critics' Choice Movie Award for best drama.

As a follow-up he directed and produced another film with McQueen, using innovative multiple screen images in the crime caper The Thomas Crown Affair (1968). From that point Jewison produced all feature films he directed, often with associate Patrick Palmer, and he also acted as producer for films directed by others, beginning with his former film editor Hal Ashby's directorial debut The Landlord (1970). After the completion of the period comedy Gaily, Gaily (1969), Jewison, having become disenchanted with the political climate in the United States, moved his family to England.

At Pinewood Studios northwest of London, and on location in Yugoslavia, he worked on the musical Fiddler on the Roof (1971, re-issued 1979), which won three Oscars and was nominated for five others, including Best Picture and Director. During the filming of Fiddler, Jewison was also the subject of the 1971 National Film Board of Canada documentary, Norman Jewison, Filmmaker, directed by Douglas Jackson.

Jewison's next project was the musical Jesus Christ Superstar (1973), based on the Broadway musical written by Andrew Lloyd Webber and Tim Rice. It was filmed in Israel, where Jewison also produced the western Billy Two Hats (1974), starring Gregory Peck. Superstar, controversial for its treatment of a religious subject, was followed by another movie that sparked critical debate, this time over violence. Rollerball (1975) is set in the near future when corporations rule the world and entertainment is centred around a deadly game. The next film he directed, the labour union drama F.I.S.T. (1978), loosely based on the life of Jimmy Hoffa, also provided some controversy, this time regarding the screenwriting credit. Screenwriter Joe Eszterhas was unhappy to share the screenwriting credit with the film's star Sylvester Stallone, as he felt that Stallone's input had been minor, while Stallone claimed to have basically rewritten the whole script.

In 1978 Jewison returned to Canada, settling in the Caledon area in Ontario and establishing a farm that produced prizewinning cattle. Operating from a base in Toronto, as well as one maintained in California, he directed high-profile actors Al Pacino in ...And Justice for All (1979), and Burt Reynolds and Goldie Hawn in the romantic comedy Best Friends (1982), and he produced The Dogs of War (1981) and Iceman (1984).

During this period Jewison also produced the 53rd Annual Academy Awards (1981), which was slated to air the day President Ronald Reagan was shot and had to be rescheduled. Revisiting the theme of racial tension that had characterized In the Heat of the Night, Jewison's A Soldier's Story (1984), based on a Pulitzer Prize winning play, was nominated for three Academy Awards, including Best Picture. His next film was also based on a successful play. Agnes of God (1985), set in a Quebec convent, starred Jane Fonda, Meg Tilly and Anne Bancroft; it received three Academy Award nominations. In 1986, he then discontinued the agreement with film producer Columbia Pictures, citing the behavior British filmmaker and head of production David Puttnam had. After a falling out with Columbia, his Yorktown Productions company was moved to Metro-Goldwyn-Mayer for a three-year agreement to direct, produce and develop pictures from the studio, and gives MGM the right of first refusal on films he wishes to make.

Jewison's next film proved to be one of the most popular romantic films ever made. Moonstruck (1987), starring Cher, was a box office hit that garnered three Academy Awards, including Best Actress for Cher. Jewison also received his third Best Director nomination.

For the next decade Jewison continued to direct feature films released by major studios: In Country (1989), a drama concerned with Vietnam veterans and the daughter of a war casualty; Other People's Money (1991), a social comedy about greed in the 1980s; Only You (1994), a romantic comedy set in Italy; and Bogus (1996), a fantasy about a young boy and his imaginary friend. He also served as producer for the film January Man (1989), executive producer for the Canadian movie Dance Me Outside, and branched back into television both as director and producer, including the series The Rez (1996–1998).

The Hurricane (1999) was Jewison's third film to explore the effects of racism, telling the story of boxer Rubin "Hurricane" Carter, who had been falsely convicted for a triple murder in New Jersey during the mid-1960s. Denzel Washington won a Golden Globe and was nominated for an Oscar for his portrayal of Carter. In 1999 Jewison's work was recognized by the Academy of Motion Picture Arts and Sciences when he was given the Irving G. Thalberg Memorial Award for lifetime achievement.

Jewison continued directing and producing up until his last film to be released, the 2003 thriller The Statement, based on a novel by Brian Moore starring Michael Caine. That same year his autobiography This Terrible Business Has Been Good to Me was published, expressing the enthusiasm, conviction and creative passion that have sustained his career.

Canadian Film Centre
Jewison's commitment and contribution to film in Canada is evidenced by his creation of the Canadian Centre for Advanced Film Studies in 1986, which opened in 1988 as an advanced film school on Windfields Estate in Toronto, Ontario. Later renamed the Canadian Film Centre (CFC).More than 1700 alumni and 100 alumni companies have come out of CFC's programs to date, including:
 Filmmakers and/or TV creators Clement Virgo and Damon D'Oliveira (The Book of Negroes), Brad Peyton (San Andreas), Daniel Bekerman (The Witch), Tassie Cameron (Rookie Blue), Michelle Lovretta (Killjoys, Lost Girl), Vincenzo Natali (Cube, Splice)
 Actors Giacomo Gianniotti (Grey's Anatomy), Annie Murphy (Schitt's Creek), Eli Goree (Race)
 Screen composer Todor Kobakov (Bitten, Closet Monster, Hellions); singers/songwriters Adaline (Grey's Anatomy, 90210), Allie X
 Digital media entrepreneurs AsapSCIENCE, Mediazoic, Wondereur
 Alumni companies Shaftesbury Films, Conquering Lion Pictures, CopperHeart Entertainment, Smiley Guy Studios, and Secret Location 

CFC has helped incubate and/or develop groundbreaking original content including hit television series Orphan Black (from creators Graeme Manson and John Fawcett, CFC alumni), the award-winning first feature Closet Monster (from writer/director alumnus Stephen Dunn (director)), and internationally award-winning documentary feature Stories We Tell (from director and CFC alumna Sarah Polley).

Additionally, feature films such as Rhymes for Young Ghouls (director Jeff Barnaby), Cube (director Vincenzo Natali), and Rude (director Clement Virgo) have been developed and produced through CFC Features.

Each year in Los Angeles, Norman Jewison bestows the CFC Award for Creative Excellence to CFC alumni in recognition of their outstanding work and contributions to the screen-based entertainment industry. Jewison presented the inaugural award to CFC alumna Semi Chellas (Mad Men) in 2014, to Graeme Manson and John Fawcett (Orphan Black) in 2015, and to Don McKellar (The Red Violin, Highway 61) in 2016.

Jewison is the Chair Emeritus of the CFC.

Achievements 

The Thalberg award was one of many honours Jewison has been awarded, including Honorary Degrees from Trent, Western Ontario and the University of Toronto, and he was made a Companion of the Order of Canada in 1992. Also in 1992, Jewison received the Ramon John Hnatyshyn Award for Voluntarism in the Performing Arts, a companion award of the Governor General's Performing Arts Awards, Canada's highest honour in the performing arts.

Jewison has been nominated for the Academy Award for Best Director three times in three separate decades for In the Heat of the Night (1967), Fiddler on the Roof (1971) and Moonstruck (1987). He has also won the prestigious Silver Bear for Best Director at the Berlin Film Festival and has earned Lifetime Achievement Awards from the Directors Guilds of both Canada and America. He has also won a BAFTA Award.

In 1971, he was the subject of the award-winning National Film Board of Canada documentary Norman Jewison, Film Maker. In addition, he has received numerous tributes at Canadian and international film festivals and retrospectives, and has been given a star on the Hollywood Walk of Fame and Canada's Walk of Fame. In 2001, a park in downtown Toronto was named after him. In 2003, Jewison received the Governor General's Performing Arts Award for Lifetime Artistic Achievement for his lifetime contribution to film in Canada.

Honours

Personal life
Norman Jewison and Margaret Ann Dixon married on July 11, 1953. She died on November 26, 2004, the day following her 74th birthday, in Orangeville, Ontario, from undisclosed causes. They have three children and five grandchildren.

In recognition of his contributions to the arts, as well as his sustained support, Jewison was installed as Chancellor of Victoria University in the University of Toronto in 2004; he held the position until October 2010.

In 2010 Blake Goldring donated $1,000,000 to Victoria University at the University of Toronto to establish a specialized first-year liberal arts program in Jewison's name. The program began in September 2011 welcoming fewer than 30 select students into Norman Jewison Stream for Imagination and the Arts. Goldring is a 1981 graduate of the school.

On January 30, 2010, Jewison received a lifetime achievement award from the Directors Guild of America at the 62nd Annual DGA Awards, held at the Century Plaza in Los Angeles.

Also in 2010, Jewison married Lynne St. David, whom he had begun dating in 2008. Her married name is Lynne St. David-Jewison.

Filmography

Film

Producer only

Acting roles

Television

Awards and nominations

Academy Awards

Golden Globe Awards

Berlin International Film Festival

British Academy Film Awards

Moscow International Film Festival

New York Film Critics Circle Award

Other awards
 American Cinema Editors Golden Eddie Award (2008)
 Directors Guild of Canada Lifetime Achievement Award (2002)
 Windsor International Film Festival Lifetime Achievement Award (2014)

References

External links

 The Norman Jewison Collection at the Victoria University Library at the University of Toronto contains photographs and publicity materials, papers and correspondence, shooting scripts and schedules for films directed or produced by Jewison between 1975 and 2003.
 Order of Canada Citation
 
 
 CBC Digital Archives: Master Storyteller Norman Jewison
 movie clips: , compilation, 5 min.

1926 births
Living people
Royal Canadian Navy personnel
American film directors
American film producers
American expatriates in England
Military personnel from Toronto
Canadian expatriate film directors in the United States
Canadian expatriates in England
Academic staff of the Canadian Film Centre
Film producers from Ontario
Canadian male film actors
Canadian people of English descent
Canadian Protestants
Canadian Screen Award winners
Companions of the Order of Canada
Film directors from Toronto
Founders of educational institutions
Golden Orange Honorary Award winners
Governor General's Performing Arts Award winners
Members of the Order of Ontario
Royal Canadian Navy personnel of World War II
Silver Bear for Best Director recipients
University of Toronto alumni